Richard Funk (born November 22, 1992, in Edmonton, Alberta) is a Canadian breaststroke swimmer.

Funk was a triple medallist at the 2015 Pan American Games in Toronto. In April 2017, Funk was named to Canada's 2017 World Aquatics Championships team in Budapest, Hungary.

Internet meme
Funk has gained notoriety for a meme which involves his name and nationality displaying as "CAN Richard FUNK".

References

External links
 
 
 
 

1992 births
Living people
Canadian male breaststroke swimmers
Swimmers from Edmonton
Swimmers at the 2014 Commonwealth Games
Swimmers at the 2015 Pan American Games
Pan American Games silver medalists for Canada
Pan American Games bronze medalists for Canada
Pan American Games medalists in swimming
World Aquatics Championships medalists in swimming
Medalists at the 2015 Pan American Games
Commonwealth Games competitors for Canada
20th-century Canadian people
21st-century Canadian people